Dapat Ka Bang Mahalin? (International title: Second Chances / ) is a 2009 Philippine television drama romance series broadcast by GMA Network. Based on a 1984 Philippine film of the same title, the series is the thirteenth instalment of Sine Novela. Directed by Maryo J. de los Reyes, it stars Aljur Abrenica and Kris Bernal. It premiered on March 2, 2009 on the network's Dramarama sa Hapon line up replacing Saan Darating ang Umaga?. The series concluded on June 19, 2009 with a total of 78 episodes. It was replaced by Kung Aagawin Mo ang Lahat sa Akin in its timeslot.

Cast and characters

Lead cast
 Aljur Abrenica as Miguelito "Lito" Sanchez
 Kris Bernal as Myrna Ramos-Sanchez

Supporting cast
 Ara Mina as Glacilda Bautista
 Paulo Avelino as Kiko Claro
 Mike Tan as Bong Ramos
 Juan Rodrigo as Rene Ramos
 Mariz Ricketts as Linda Ramos
 Lloyd Samartino as Eddie Sanchez
 Maritoni Fernandez as Constance "Connie" Sanchez
 Carlo Aquino as Philippe "Phil" Bautista
 Maybelyn Dela Cruz as Cherry Ramos
 Rhea Nakpil as Encar
 Jana Roxas as Antonia Claro
 Krystal Reyes as Angeli Claro
 Say Alonzo as Anina
 Jake Vargas as Elmer Ramos
 Matutina as Sima
 Dart Zia as Yanboy
 Kiko Junio as Ovige
 Lawrence Gutierrez as Migs

Guest cast
 Pen Medina as Tata Teryo
 Julio Diaz as Rafael Bautista
 Ana Capri as Jessa
 Boy Roque as Phil's jailmate

Ratings
According to AGB Nielsen Philippines' Mega Manila household television ratings, the pilot episode of Dapat Ka Bang Mahalin? earned a 22.1% rating. While the final episode scored a 30.5% rating.

References

External links
 

2009 Philippine television series debuts
2009 Philippine television series endings
Filipino-language television shows
GMA Network drama series
Live action television shows based on films
Philippine romance television series
Television shows based on comics
Television shows set in the Philippines